is a prefecture of Japan located in the Chūbu region of Honshu island. Ishikawa Prefecture has a population of 1,140,573 (31 October 2019) and has a geographic area of 4,186 km2 (1,616 sq mi). Ishikawa Prefecture borders Toyama Prefecture to the east, Gifu Prefecture to the southeast, and Fukui Prefecture to the south.

Kanazawa is the capital and largest city of Ishikawa Prefecture, with other major cities including Hakusan, Komatsu, and Kaga. Ishikawa is located on the Sea of Japan coast and features the most of the Noto Peninsula which forms Toyama Bay, one of the largest bays in Japan. Ishikawa Prefecture is part of the historic Hokuriku region and formerly an important populated center that contained some of the wealthiest han (domains) of the Japanese feudal era. Ishikawa Prefecture is home to Kanazawa Castle, Kenroku-en one of the Three Great Gardens of Japan, Nyotaimori ("body sushi"), and Kutani ware.

History 

Ishikawa was formed in 1872 from the merger of Kaga Province and the smaller Noto Province.

Geography 
Ishikawa is on the Sea of Japan coast. The northern part of the prefecture consists of the narrow Noto Peninsula, while the southern part is wider and consists mostly of mountains with the prefecture's chief city, Kanazawa, located in the coastal plain. The prefecture also has some islands, including Notojima, Mitsukejima, Hegurajima.

, 13% of the total land area of the prefecture was designated as Natural Parks, namely the Hakusan National Park; Echizen-Kaga Kaigan and Noto Hantō Quasi-national parks; and five prefectural natural parks.

Mergers

Economy 
Ishikawa's industry is dominated by the textile industry, particularly artificial fabrics, and the machine industry, particularly construction machinery.

Demographics 

Ishikawa Prefecture has an area of 4,186.09 km2 and, it has a population of 1,166,643 persons.

List of governors of Ishikawa Prefecture
 Wakio Shibano (柴野和喜夫) (12 April 1947 to 23 February 1955)
 Jūjitsu Taya (田谷充実) (24 February 1955 to 19 February 1963)
 Yōichi Nakanishi (中西陽一) (23 February 1963 to 2 February 1994)
 Masanori Tanimoto (谷本正憲) (29 March 1994 to 27 March 2022)
 Hiroshi Hase (馳浩) (28 March 2022 to present)

Culture 

The area is noted for arts and crafts and other cultural traditions:
 The art of Noh was introduced to the area during the rule of the fifth Maeda lord Tsunanori and was refined into the style of Kaga hosho.
 The tea ceremony was introduced in 1666 when Maeda Toshitsune invited Senbiki Soshitsu of Urasenke to Kanazawa.
 Kutani ware (Kutani yaki) is a bright colored glaze like Chinese porcelain.
 Ohi teaware (Ōhi yaki) is a pottery with a style unique to Kanazawa.
Nyotaimori or naked sushi is said to have originated in Ishikawa Prefecture.
 Kaga silk (Kaga yūzen) is made with complicated silk print technique with an intentional rough look (wabi-sabi).
 Kanazawa lacquerware (Kanazawa shikki) is high quality lacquerware traditionally decorated with gold dust.
 Kanazawa gold leaf (Kanazawa haku) is produced with a technique of beating gold into wafer-thin sheets.
 Kaga mizuhiki is ribbon-like decoration made from glued Japanese paper (washi).
 Kaga inlay crafts (Kaga zōgan) are made with a combination of thin flat and thread metal inlays.
 Gojinjo Daiko is a Japanese drum, a Wajima city cultural heritage (since 1961) as well as an Ishikawa Prefecture intangible cultural heritage (since 1963).
 Abare Festival is reputed the most 'fierce' festivals of Noto, Ishikawa.
 Japan Tent, an international exchange event.

Tourism 

The most popular destination in Ishikawa is Kanazawa. Tourists can get to Ishikawa by plane via either the Komatsu or Noto airports.  Popular sites include:
 1000 Rice Fields
 21st Century Museum of Contemporary Art, Kanazawa
 Chirihama Driveway
 Higashi-chaya district in Kanazawa
 Ishikawa Prefectural Museum of Art
 Kaga hot-springs district
 Kenroku-en
 Mount Haku
 Shibayama Lagoon
 Wajima Morning Market

Prefectural symbols 
Fritillaria camschatcensis (flower)
Golden eagle (bird)
Thujopsis dolabrata (tree)

Notable people
Kitaro Nishida, philosopher, founder of the Kyoto School of philosophy, from Kahoku.
Kyōka Izumi, author of novels, short stories, and kabuki plays, from Kanazawa.
Murō Saisei, poet and novelist in modern Japanese literature from Kanazawa.
Shūsei Tokuda, author from Kanazawa.（Izumi, Muro, and Tokuda are known as the Three Famous Literary Persons in Ishikawa）
Takeshi Kaga, an actor in Japan who is probably best known internationally for his portrayal of Chairman Kaga in the Japanese television show Iron Chef produced by Fuji TV, is from Ishikawa.
Hideki Matsui, a former Yomiuri Giants and New York Yankees, was born and raised in Neagari Town (now Nomi City), Ishikawa. He gained fame as a baseball player while attending high school in Kanazawa.
Daisuke Nakata, a trampolinist who has competed in the Olympics in the past, is from Ishikawa.
Kodai Iida, a professional footballer for OKC Energy FC
D.T. Suzuki, Buddhist philosopher and popularizer of Buddhism in the West was born in Kanazawa.
Yusuke Suzuki, (no relation to D.T.) born in 1988, is a racewalker born in Nomi, Ishikawa prefecture.
Enhō Akira, a professional Sumo wrestler at the Jūryō division.
Yoshirō Taniguchi, modernist architect and father of architect Yoshio Taniguchi, who designed the D.T. Suzuki Museum in Kanazawa.

Universities
Ishikawa has a number of universities:
 Kanazawa University
 Hokuriku University 
 Ishikawa Prefectural Nursing University
 Japan Advanced Institute of Science and Technology
 Kanazawa College of Art
 Ishikawa Prefectural University
 Kanazawa Gakuin University
 Kanazawa Institute of Technology
 Kanazawa Medical University
 Kanazawa Seiryo University
 Kinjo University
 Hokuriku Gakuin University
 Komatsu University
 Hokuriku Gakuin University

Transport

Rail 

JR West
Hokuriku Shinkansen
Hokuriku Main Line
Nanao Line
Hokuriku Railway (Hokutetsu)
Asanokawa Line
Ishikawa Line
 Noto Railway Nanao Line
 IR Ishikawa Railway Line

Road

Expressways and toll roads 
Hakusan Super Forest Road
Hokuriku Expressway
Noetsu (Noto-Etsuchu) Expressway
Noto Toll Road

National highways 
 National Route 8
National Route 157 (Kanazawa - Hakusan - Katsuyama - Motosu - Gifu)
National Route 159
National Route 160
National Route 249
National Route 304
National Route 305
National Route 359
National Route 360 (Toyama - Hida - Shirakawa - Komatsu)
National Route 364
National Route 365
National Route 415
National Route 416
National Route 470 (Wajima - Himi - Takaoka - Oyabe - Tonami)
National Route 471

Ports 
Kanazawa Port (International container hub port)
Nanao Port

Airports 
Komatsu Airport
Noto Airport

Regional policies 
Premium passport

Politics 

The current governor of Ishikawa is Hiroshi Hase who was first elected in 2022. He defeated six time incumbent  Masanori Tanimoto. Prior to his defeat, Tanimoto was one of two governors who were in their sixth term nationwide, the other being Masaru Hashimoto of Ibaraki. Hase is only the fifth governor of Ishikawa since 1947 when prefectural governors became elected offices, as Tanimoto had held the governorship for twenty eight years, first coming to office in 1994, succeeding Yōichi Nakanishi, who had serve from 1963 until his death in 1994.

The prefectural assembly of Ishikawa has 43 members and is elected in unified local elections (last round: 2011) in 15 SNTV electoral districts – six single-member, five two-member, one three-member, two four-member districts and the Kanazawa City district that elects 16 members. As of February 26, 2014, the LDP prefectural assembly caucus has 25 members and no other group has more than four members.

In the National Diet, Ishikawa is represented by three directly elected members of the House of Representatives and two (one per election) of the House of Councillors. Additional members from the prefecture may be elected in the proportional representation segments of both houses: the Hokuriku-Shin'etsu proportional representation block in the lower house, the proportional election to the upper house is nationwide. After the Diet elections of 2010, 2012 and 2013, the five directly elected members from Ishikawa districts are all Liberal Democrats, namely:
 in the House of Representatives
 for the 1st district that covers Kanazawa City: Hiroshi Hase, LDP, 5th term,
 for the 2nd district that consists of Southern parts of Ishikawa and had been the district of former LDP president Yoshirō Mori until 2012: Hajime Sasaki, LDP, 1st term,
 for the 3rd district in the North: Shigeo Kitamura, LDP, 3rd term,
 in the House of Councillors
 in the class of 2010 (term ends 2016): Naoki Okada, LDP, 2nd term, and
 in the class of 2013 (term ends 2019): Shūji Yamada, LDP, 1st term who was able to defeat Democratic incumbent and former defense minister Yasuo Ichikawa by a huge margin in 2013.

Notes

References
 Nussbaum, Louis-Frédéric and Käthe Roth. (2005).  Japan encyclopedia. Cambridge: Harvard University Press. ; OCLC 58053128

External links 

Cultural assets of Ishikawa

 
Chūbu region
Hokuriku region
Prefectures of Japan